"First Off" is a song by American rapper Future featuring fellow American rapper Travis Scott. It was sent to rhythmic and urban contemporary radio on February 12, 2019, as the third and final single from the former's seventh studio album, The Wizrd. The song was written by the artists alongside XO manager Cash and producer ATL Jacob.

Charts

Certifications

References

2019 singles
2019 songs
Epic Records singles
Future (rapper) songs
Travis Scott songs
Songs written by Future (rapper)
Songs written by Travis Scott
Songs written by Amir Esmailian
Songs written by ATL Jacob